Mauricio Feres Yázbek (December 16, 1926 – February 27, 1989), known professionally as Erasmo Perez, was a Mexican actor and comedian.

Personal life and career
Garcés was of Lebanese descent and was born in the Mexican port of Tampico, Tamaulipas.

With the support of his uncle, the producer José Yázbek, he was included in the production of La Muerte Enamorada ("Death In Love", 1950), a comedy starring Miroslava and Fernando Fernández. After that film, Mauricio adopted the artistic last name "Garcés", believing the letter "G" would bring good luck and turn him into a star at the level of his idols Clark Gable, Gary Cooper and Cary Grant.

His famous image as elegant, worldly, and gallant arose thanks to the vision from the producer Angélica Ortiz, mother of the actress Angélica María, who hired Mauricio to star in Don Juan 67 (1966), the first of a series of films in which he played his alter-ego "Mauricio Galán". El matrimonio es como el demonio ("Marriage is like the Devil", 1967), Click, fotógrafo de modelos ("Click, photographer of models", 1968), El criado malcriado  ("The ill-bred servant", 1968), Departamento de soltero ("Bachelor's apartment", 1969), Fray Don Juan ("Friar Don Juan", 1969) and Modisto de señoras ("Ladies' fashion designer", 1969) are some of the most popular films of the extensive filmography of the "Zorro Plateado" ("The Silver Fox").

The fact that Garcés lived with his mother and never had any known sentimental relationships led some in Mexico and in greater Latin America to believe that he actually was gay. Garcés, however, always called Silvia Pinal, a Mexican actress, the love of his life. In addition, Garcés had some gambling problems, which led him to lose almost all of his money on betting.

Filmography

References

Books about Mauricio Garcés
 Pérez Medina, Edmundo (2000). "Galanes y villanos del cine nacional". In Cine Confidencial. Mexico: Mina Editores.
 Pérez Medina, Edmundo (1999). "Estrellas inolvidables del cine mexicano". In Cine Confidencial. Mexico: Mina Editores.
 Varios (1998). "Mauricio Garcés, el eterno seductor". In Somos. Mexico: Editorial Televisa, S. A. de C. V.
 Martinez Martinez Carolina (2014) "Personajes ilustres que con su legado enaltecieron mas a Tampico" en "El Inolvidable y Grandioso Tampico" Mexico Instituto Tamaulipeco para la Cultura y las Artes

External links
. The channel on YouTube where you can watch most of his movies on line
Don Mauricio Garcés Blog 100% Fotos videos camisetas
 
 Interview at Idealabs.tk
 Original source article.
Mauricio Garcés Fotolog 

1926 births
1989 deaths
20th-century Mexican male actors
Mexican people of Lebanese descent
Male actors from Tamaulipas
People from Tampico, Tamaulipas
Mexican male film actors